Siphonostomatoida is an order of copepods, containing around 75% of all the copepods that parasitise fishes. Their success has been linked to their possession of siphon-like mandibles and of a "frontal filament" to aid attachment to their hosts. Most are marine, but a few live in fresh water. There are 40 recognised families:

Archidactylinidae Izawa, 1996
Artotrogidae Brady, 1880
Asterocheridae Giesbrecht, 1899
Brychiopontiidae Humes, 1974
Caligidae Burmeister, 1835
Calverocheridae Stock, 1968
Cancerillidae Giesbrecht, 1897
Codobidae Boxshall & Ohtsuka, 2001
Coralliomyzontidae Humes & Stock, 1991
Dichelesthiidae Milne-Edwards, 1840
Dichelinidae Boxshall & Ohtsuka, 2001
Dinopontiidae Murnane, 1967
Dirivultidae Humes & Dojiri, 1980
Dissonidae Yamaguti, 1963
Ecbathyriontidae Humes, 1987
Entomolepididae Brady, 1899
Eudactylinidae C. B. Wilson, 1932
Hatschekiidae Kabata, 1979
Hyponeoidae Heegaard, 1962
Kroyeriidae Kabata, 1979
Lernaeopodidae Milne-Edwards, 1840
Lernanthropidae Kabata, 1979
Megapontiidae Heptner, 1968
Micropontiidae Gooding, 1957
Nanaspididae Humes & Cressey, 1959
Nicothoidae Dana, 1852
Pandaridae Milne Edwards, 1840
Pennellidae Burmeister, 1835
Pontoeciellidae Giesbrecht, 1895
Pseudocycnidae C. B. Wilson, 1922
Pseudohatschekiidae Tang et al., 2010
Rataniidae Giesbrecht, 1897
Samarusidae Lee J. & I.H. Kim, 2018
Scottomyzontidae Ivanenko et al., 2001
Sphyriidae C. B. Wilson, 1919
Sponginticolidae Topsent, 1928
Spongiocnizontidae Stock & Kleeton, 1964
Stellicomitidae Humes & Cressey, 1958
Tanypleuridae Kabata, 1969
Trebiidae C. B. Wilson, 1905

References

External links

 
Copepods
Crustacean orders